Sir Sven Wohlford Hansen, 1st Baronet MBE (1 April 1876 – 9 October 1958) was a Welsh shipowner and shipbuilder.

Hansen was born in South Wales, the son of Carl Frederick Hansen, a shipowner of Scandinavian extraction. He initially joined his father's business, but later branched out on his own. His Cardiff Hall Steamship Line became one of the largest operating out of the Bristol Channel ports and was especially successful during the First World War.

He also revived the shipbuilding industry in the Devon town of Bideford after a lapse of fifty years, establishing the Hansen Shipbuilding and Ship-repairing Co Ltd.

Hansen was appointed Member of the Order of the British Empire (MBE) in the 1920 civilian war honours for his services to shipping and created a baronet in the 1921 New Year Honours for his services to Bideford. For many years he was commemorated annually in the town.

Footnotes

References
Obituary, The Times, 16 October 1958

1876 births
1958 deaths
Welsh shipbuilders
Members of the Order of the British Empire
Baronets in the Baronetage of the United Kingdom
British businesspeople in shipping
Welsh businesspeople in shipping